Gaulettia is a genus of flowering plants belonging to the family Chrysobalanaceae.

Its native range is Southern Tropical America.

Species:

Gaulettia amaraliae 
Gaulettia canescens 
Gaulettia canomensis 
Gaulettia cognata 
Gaulettia elata 
Gaulettia foveolata 
Gaulettia parillo 
Gaulettia racemosa 
Gaulettia steyermarkii

References

Chrysobalanaceae
Chrysobalanaceae genera